Mamikon Gharibyan (born 21 September 2004) is an Armenian International Master (IM) (2020).

Biography
Mamikon Gharibyan started playing chess at the age of six. In 2012, he won the Armenian Youth Chess Championship in the U08 age group, but in 2014 Mamikon Gharibyan was best in the U10 age group. In 2013, he won the international youth chess tournament Nona Gaprindashvili cup.

Mamikon Gharibyan repeatedly represented Armenia at the European Youth Chess Championships and World Youth Chess Championships in different age groups, where he won two gold medals: in 2014, in Batumi at the European Youth Chess Championship in the U10 age group, and in 2016, in Prague at the European Youth Chess Championship in the U12 age group.

References

External links

Mamikon Gharibyan chess games at 365Chess.com

2004 births
Living people
Armenian chess players
Chess FIDE Masters